Tingena seclusa is a species of moth in the family Oecophoridae. It is endemic to New Zealand and has been observed in the Canterbury and Otago regions. The larvae of this species are litter leaf feeders and the adults of this species are on the wing from December to February.

Taxonomy 
This species was first described by Alfred Philpott in 1921 using a male specimen collected at Ben Lomond in December, and another specimen collected at Lake Luna also in December and named Borkhausenia seclusa.  George Hudson discussed and illustrated this species under the name Borkhausenia seclusa in his 1928 publication The butterflies and moths of New Zealand. Philpott also discussed this species under the name B. seclusa and illustrated the male genitalia of a paratype specimen. In 1988 J. S. Dugdale placed this species within the genus Tingena.  The male holotype specimen, collected at Lake Luna, is held at the New Zealand Arthropod Collection.

Description

Philpott first described this species as follows:

Distribution 
This species is endemic to New Zealand and has been observed in the Otago and Canterbury regions.

Behaviour 
The adults of this species are on the wing in December to February. The larvae of this species are litter leaf feeders.

References

Oecophoridae
Moths of New Zealand
Moths described in 1921
Endemic fauna of New Zealand
Taxa named by Alfred Philpott
Endemic moths of New Zealand